Rugendorf is a municipality in the district of Kulmbach in Bavaria in Germany.

Municipal division

Rugendorf is arranged in the following boroughs:

References

Kulmbach (district)